Bogus is a surname. Notable people with the surname include:

 Adelina Boguș (born 1988), Romanian rower
 Carl Bogus (born 1948), American legal scholar
 Liz Bogus (born 1984), American soccer player
 Marcin Boguś (born 1973), Polish footballer

See also
 
 Bogguss

Polish-language surnames